P. surinamensis  may refer to:
 Propustularia surinamensis, a sea snail species
 Pycnoscelus surinamensis, the Surinam cockroach, an insect species